Bellmore (also known as Belle Moore, North Hampton or Northampton) is an unincorporated community in Union Township, Parke County, in the U.S. state of Indiana. U.S. Route 36 and State Road 59 intersect in Bellmore.

History
A post office has been in operation at Bellmore since 1852.

Geography

References

Unincorporated communities in Indiana
Unincorporated communities in Parke County, Indiana